This is a list, in year order, of the most notable films produced in the Soviet Occupation Zone of Germany and the socialist German Democratic Republic (GDR, East Germany) from 1945 until German Reunification in October 1990.

The state owned East German film company DEFA produced about 800 feature films between 1946 and 1992. Besides DEFA, the state broadcaster DFF and the Deutsche Hochschule für Filmkunst (now the Filmuniversität Babelsberg) were the only other organizations in the GDR that produced feature films for cinematic release, although far fewer than DEFA. DEFA also produced about 750 animated movies and more than 2500 documentaries and short films.

DEFA feature films are accessible and licensable as part of DEFA's entire film heritage on the PROGRESS archive platform.

For an alphabetical list of articles on East German films see :Category:East German films.

1945–1949 (the Soviet Sector of Germany) 
Note that the German Democratic Republic formally came into existence in October 1949.

1950s

1960s

1970s

1980s

See also 
 Cinema of Germany
 Culture of East Germany
 DEFA (film studio)
 DEFA Film Library
 Film censorship in East Germany
 List of German submissions for the Academy Award for Best International Feature Film#East Germany
 Lists of German films
 Ostern (Eastern-bloc Westerns)

Notes

External links
 East German film at the Internet Movie Database

East German films
 East German